Marvin Diop (born 8 August 1992) is a French footballer who plays as a striker for Championnat National side JA Drancy.

Career
Diop made his Ligue 2 debut on 3 October 2014 against Chamois Niortais replacing Mouaad Madri after 74 minutes in a 0–0 home draw. He scored his first professional goal on 17 October 2014 in a 1–1 away draw against Clermont Foot.

Career statistics

References

1992 births
Living people
Association football forwards
French footballers
AC Ajaccio players
ASM Belfort players
JA Drancy players
Ligue 2 players
Championnat National players